Komar is a village in the Volnovakha Raion of the Donetsk Oblast, in Ukraine.

Geography
The village is located on the right bank of the  River. The distance to Velyka Novosilka is about 21 km and it passes by a local highway.

History
Komar was founded in 1780 by Greek immigrants from the Crimean village of the same name. From the moment of its foundation to the present day, the main activity is agriculture and, first of all, grain production.

Demographics
According to the 2001 Ukrainian Census, the population of the village was 1,705 people, of which 8.09% stated that their mother tongue was Ukrainian, 84.16% - Russian, 7.33% - Greek, 0.12% - Armenian, and 0.06% - Belarusian.

Famous people
Serhiy Vasyliovych Golovko is the director of the agricultural society, an honored worker of agriculture of Ukraine.

The following were born in the settlement:
 (* 1946) a Ukrainian artist.
 (1908-1999) a Hero of the Soviet Union.

References

1780 establishments in the Russian Empire
Populated places established in 1780
Villages in Volnovakha Raion